The midnight parrotfish (Scarus coelestinus) is a species of parrotfish that inhabits coral reefs mainly in the Caribbean, Bahamas, and Florida.

The typical size is between 30 and 60 cm, but it can grow to almost 1 m. It has been observed as far north as Maryland and as far south as Brazil. Usually found between 3 and 80 m deep, it swims over reefs and sandy areas, where it feeds on algae by scraping it with its teeth fused into a beak.

Description 
The midnight parrotfish has a deep blue body with light blue patches along its sides and head. The exact location of light blue patches differs between each fish, but all midnight parrotfish have a light blue patch on the underside of the beak. Unlike other parrotfish species, the midnight parrotfish retains its coloring through its juvenile and adult stages of life. Both male and female midnight parrotfish exhibit this coloring. The parrotfish gains its name from its hard beak it uses to scrape its food from hard substrates.

Feeding 
The midnight parrotfish, along with other parrotfishes, is primarily a herbivore. Their main source of food is algae, which they scrape from coral and other hard substrates using their beak. Through this process, the parrotfish also consumes carbonate sediments and assists in moving sediment around the reef. The midnight parrotfish can take up to 16,000 bites a day as an adult, and 28,000 a day as a juvenile. In addition to herbivory, evidence suggests that midnight parrotfish also consume sergeant major damselfish eggs. Unlike other species of parrotfish that live in mangrove forests, the midnight parrotfish has not been shown to consume sponges.

Habitat 
The midnight parrotfish inhabits coral reefs mainly in the Caribbean, southern Florida, and the southern Gulf of Mexico, but has been found as far north as Maryland and as far south as Brazil. Midnight parrotfish were found to be the only species of 32 Caribbean reef fishes to not have a significant zonation among patch or crest reefs. While less abundant than other parrotfish species such as the queen parrotfish (Scarus vetula), striped parrotfish (Scarus iseri), stoplight parrotfish (Sparisoma viride), and redband parrotfish (Sparisoma aurofrenatum), the midnight parrotfish is an important part of the trophic web. Like other parrotfish, the midnight parrotfish controls algal populations through feeding, and encourages coral growth through its grazing. Midnight parrotfish have been found at depths between 5 and 75 meters.

Schooling

Midnight Parrotfish 
Midnight parrotfish typically do not exhibit schooling behavior, as they are able to feed on algae without the assist of other organisms. Midnight parrotfish have been seen to school with up to 30 other individuals in order to secure food from damselfish nests. Typically heavily guarded by the damselfish, schools of midnight parrotfish can overwhelm a nest and secure both the algae within it and the eggs of sergeant major damselfish. Bite scars within the sergeant major damselfish nests indicate this behavior is common. As with other large species of parrotfish, the midnight parrotfish typically occurs in lower concentrations throughout most of its habitats. Higher concentrations of parrotfish are more common in areas with low fishing.

Blue Tang 
Midnight parrotfish are also known to exhibit co-schooling behavior with blue tang. The arrangement allows both species to feed on algae, and provides the parrotfish with protection. The coloring of blue tang schools camoflauges the parrotfish, as its dark blue pigment matches that of the blue tang while its light blue pigment matches the rays of sunlight between blue tang. Blue tang have ventral spikes, which has the added benefit to the parrotfish of wielding away predators. The schools are typically composed of 50 to 400 blue tang with up to 17 midnight parrotfish, although a majority of schools include 1 or 2 parrotfish. Both blue tang and parrotfish compete with damselfish for algae, and the co-schooling behavior allows both species to gain access to damselfish-protected algal clumps.

Conservation and protection 
Midnight parrotfish are cited as 'Least Concern' on the IUCN Red List. This is due to the high concentrations of midnight parrotfish in the Gulf of Mexico and Caribbean. Midnight parrotfish are protected species in United States waters, as well as a number of marine protected areas in the Caribbean. However, Cuban spear-fishers often target the midnight parrotfish along with other parrotfish species, which has led to a slight decline in population.

References

External links
 

midnight parrotfish
Fish of the Western Atlantic
Taxa named by Achille Valenciennes
midnight parrotfish